Keith Peinke (born 30 May 1983) is a South African cricketer. He played in one first-class and four List A matches for Border in 2004 and 2005.

See also
 List of Border representative cricketers

References

External links
 

1983 births
Living people
South African cricketers
Border cricketers
Cricketers from East London, Eastern Cape